Mr. Sycamore is a play written by Ketti Frings that was published in 1942. It is about a meek mailman who becomes so obsessed with a particular sycamore tree on his delivery route that he leads himself to believe that the only way to end his troubles is to plant himself and become a tree. On Broadway, Mr. Sycamore starred Lillian Gish and Stuart Erwin.

In 1975, the play was adapted into a movie by the same name with Jason Robards, Sandy Dennis and Jean Simmons in the lead roles.

References
"The Play in Review" by Brooks Atkinson, The New York Times, November 14, 1942

External links

Mr. Sycamore at Allmovie.com

1942 plays
Broadway plays
Plays by Ketti Frings
American plays adapted into films